The 1986 NCAA Division I baseball season, play of college baseball in the United States organized by the National Collegiate Athletic Association (NCAA) began in the spring of 1986.  The season progressed through the regular season and concluded with the 1986 College World Series.  The College World Series, held for the fortieth time in 1986, consisted of one team from each of eight regional competitions and was held in Omaha, Nebraska, at Johnny Rosenblatt Stadium as a double-elimination tournament.  Arizona claimed the championship for the third time.

Realignment and format changes
The Big South Conference was granted NCAA Division I status, joining after one season in the NAIA.  The members were Armstrong State, Augusta State, Baptist, Campbell, Coastal Carolina, Radford, UNC Asheville, and Winthrop.
The Colonial Athletic Association began sponsoring baseball, with American, East Carolina, George Mason, James Madison, Richmond, UNC Wilmington, and William & Mary composing the seven team league.
The Southeastern Conference dissolved its two division format, playing as a single conference with all teams playing a three-game series against every other conference member.
Stetson joined the Trans America Athletic Conference.  They had previously played as an independent.

Conference winners
This is a partial list of conference champions from the 1986 season.  The NCAA sponsored regional competitions to determine the College World Series participants.  Four regionals of four teams and four of six each competed in double-elimination tournaments, with the winners advancing to Omaha.  25 teams earned automatic bids by winning their conference championship while 15 teams earned at-large selections.

Conference standings
The following is an incomplete list of conference standings:

College World Series

The 1986 season marked the fortieth NCAA Baseball Tournament, which culminated with the eight team College World Series.  The College World Series was held in Omaha, Nebraska.  The eight teams played a double-elimination format, with Arizona claiming their third championship with a 10–2 win over Florida State in the final.

Award winners

All-America team

References